Rendition is a 2007 American political thriller film directed by Gavin Hood and starring Reese Witherspoon, Jake Gyllenhaal, Meryl Streep, Peter Sarsgaard, Alan Arkin, and Omar Metwally. It centers on the controversial CIA practice of extraordinary rendition and is based on the true story of Khalid El-Masri, who was mistaken for Khalid al-Masri.

Plot
In North Africa, CIA analyst Douglas Freeman (Jake Gyllenhaal) briefs an agent. A suicide attack kills the agent and 18 civilians; the target was high-ranking police official Abbas-i "Abasi" Fawal (Yigal Naor), a liaison for the United States who conducts interrogations with techniques amounting to torture, but Fawal is unharmed.

Egyptian-born Anwar El-Ibrahimi (Omar Metwally), a chemical engineer living in Chicago with his mother, his pregnant wife Isabella (Reese Witherspoon), and their young son, is believed linked to known terrorist Rashid by records indicating several calls to Anwar's cellphone. Returning from a conference in South Africa, Anwar is detained by American officials and sent to a secret facility near the earlier attack, where he is interrogated and tortured.

Isabella is not informed of her husband’s whereabouts, and all official evidence of his being on the plane at Cape Town International Airport is erased.

Freeman, assigned to observe Anwar’s interrogation by Fawal, is doubtful of Anwar’s guilt, but CIA superior Corrine Whitman (Meryl Streep) insists such treatments are necessary to save potential victims of terrorism.

Isabella travels to Washington, D.C. to ask friend Alan Smith (Peter Sarsgaard), an aide to Senator Hawkins (Alan Arkin), to find her missing husband. Smith informs Isabella that Anwar failed to board the plane in Cape Town, but she shows him her husband's credit card purchase at the in-flight duty-free shop, confirming he was on the flight. Smith pieces together details of Anwar's detention but is unable to convince Hawkins or Whitman, who ordered the rendition, to release Anwar or acknowledge his imprisonment.

Hawkins tells Smith to let the matter go, as public debate on extraordinary rendition would complicate the senator’s bill before Congress. His sympathetic secretary tips Isabella off that Whitman will be visiting. Isabella confronts Whitman and Hawkins before being led out by security, only to go into labour in the hallway.

Under torture, Anwar eventually confesses that he advised a man named Rashid on chemicals to enhance explosives and was promised $40,000. Freeman suspects a false confession, confirmed when the names Anwar gives are traced by Interpol and draw a blank. A quick Google search reveals the names belong to an Egyptian soccer team. Freeman approaches the Minister of the Interior with this finding, questioning why a man with a $200,000 salary would risk his life for $40,000. When discussing the value of intelligence gathered through torture, Freeman quotes from  The Merchant of Venice by William Shakespeare: "I fear you speak upon the rack, Where men enforced do speak anything."

Freeman persuades the minister to release Anwar, sending him back to America via a clandestine ship to Spain, ignoring Whitman's frantic orders to hand Anwar back to Fawal and knowing he will probably be branded as insubordinate. Meanwhile, Smith similarly disregards Hawkins' advice and leaks the torture details to the press, igniting a worldwide scandal and likely ending his political aspirations. Anwar returns home and shares a tearful reunion with Isabella, his son, and their newborn baby.

Sub-plot
In a parallel storyline, Abasi Fawal's daughter Fatima (Zineb Oukach) runs away with her boyfriend Khalid (Moa Khouas). Abasi learns Khalid's late brother was an inmate at his prison.

Fatima learns that Khalid belongs to a terrorist group, and discovers a notebook with pictures: Khalid and his brother brandishing AK-47s; a grief-stricken Khalid standing over his brother's corpse; her father; and a statement that Khalid will avenge his brother.

Realising that her father, responsible for the death of Khalid's brother, is about to be assassinated by Khalid, she runs to the town square and confronts Khalid. He hesitates, and is killed by the attack’s organizers; he releases the dead man's switch, and Fatima is killed in the explosion from the beginning of the film.

Abasi rushes to Khalid's apartment and discovers Khalid's grandmother grieving the loss of her grandsons and Fatima. Abasi realizes his daughter died trying to protect him.

Theory
The phone record implicating Anwar remains unexplained. It is mentioned that phones are often passed off to avoid tracing; the DVD extras explain a subplot on this concept that was cut from the film. Director Gavin Hood stated in an interview that the ambiguity of Anwar’s involvement was deliberate, to let the viewer decide whether the possibility of his guilt justified kidnapping and torture.

Cast

 Reese Witherspoon as Isabella Fields El-Ibrahimi
 Jake Gyllenhaal as Douglas Freeman
 Meryl Streep as Corinne Whitman
 Omar Metwally as Anwar El-Ibrahimi
 Alan Arkin as Senator Hawkins
 Peter Sarsgaard as Alan Smith
 Aramis Knight as Jeremy El-Ibrahimi
 Rosie Malek-Yonan as Nuru El-Ibrahimi
 Moa Khouas as Khalid El-Emin
 Zineb Oukach as Fatima Fawal
 Yigal Naor as Abasi Fawal
 J. K. Simmons as Lee Mayers
 Bob Gunton as Lars Whitman
 Hadar Ratzon as Safiya  
 Reymond Amsalem as Layla Fawal
 Simon Abkarian as Said Abdel Aziz
 Wendy Phillips as Samantha
 Laila Mrabti as Lina Fawal
 Christian Martin as Senator Lewis' Aide

Reception
Reviews for Rendition were mixed. Review aggregator Rotten Tomatoes reports a 47% approval rating from critics, based on 152 reviews, with the consensus noting "The impressive cast cannot rescue Rendition, which explores complex issues in woefully simplified terms." On Metacritic, the film averaged a score of 55 based on 34 reviews. Roger Ebert awarded the film four stars out of four, saying, "Rendition is valuable and rare. As I wrote from Toronto: 'It is a movie about the theory and practice of two things: torture and personal responsibility. And it is wise about what is right, and what is wrong.'" In contrast, Peter Travers of Rolling Stone applauded the cast, but noted that the film was a "bust as a persuasive drama". Travers declared the film the year's Worst Anti-War Film on his list of the Worst Movies of 2007.

See also
 Extraordinary Rendition (film)

References

External links
 
 
 
 
 
 
 Rendition at The Black Commentator

2007 films
2000s political thriller films
2000s spy films
American nonlinear narrative films
Extraordinary rendition program
Films set in Egypt
Films set in South Africa
Films set in Illinois
Films directed by Gavin Hood
Films about terrorism
Films shot in Morocco
Films about kidnapping
Films about the Central Intelligence Agency
Films produced by Steve Golin
Hyperlink films
New Line Cinema films
American political thriller films
American political drama films
2000s English-language films
2000s American films